The Canadian Society of Respiratory Therapists (CSRT) was founded in 1964 as the Canadian Society of Inhalation Therapy Technicians. Currently it is the Canadian national professional association for respiratory therapists.

Publications
 Canadian Journal of Respiratory Therapy

Education and credentialing

Respiratory therapists in Canada graduate from three-year training programs offered by community colleges and institutes of technology. Some universities also offer four-year respiratory therapy degrees. The didactic component of the program is provided at the college, institute of technology or university and students receive clinical training in hospital and home care settings.

Following graduation from CSRT approved programs, students are eligible to write the CSRT National Certification Examination. Successful candidates earn the CSRT Registered Respiratory Therapist credential.

See also 
 

Respiratory therapy
Pulmonology and respiratory therapy organizations
1964 establishments in Ontario
Medical associations based in Canada